Adam Robert Pine  (born 28 February 1976) is a retired Australian freestyle and butterfly swimmer.  He was an Australian Institute of Sport scholarship holder.

Pine competed for Australia in the 2000, and 2004 and 2008 Summer Olympics. In 2000, he swam in the heats for the gold (4×100-metre freestyle relay) and silver (4×100-metre medley relay) medal winning relay teams. In 2004, he swam in the 100-metre butterfly and was a member of the Australian 4×100-metre medley relay team, however this relay team failed to reach the finals.

Pine recited the Athletes Oath at the 2006 Commonwealth Games, this was an appropriate gesture as he has won medals for Australia in the three Commonwealth Games leading up to the Melbourne games.

At the age of 31 he qualified for the 2008 Summer Olympics in the 100-metre butterfly (52.13).  At the 2009 Rome World Championship trials (Australian Long Course swimming trials) Pine swam in the finals finishing 2nd in the 100-metre butterfly.  This swim was under the A qualifying time for the world championships and earned himself a spot on the Australian World Championship Team.

Pine trained at CISAC in Bruce, ACT registered with the Ginninderra Marlins Swim Club.  His coach was Cameron Gledhill.  Adam is married to Sasha Pine, the daughter of Olympic swimmers Diana Rickard and Roger van Hamburg.  Adam and Sasha both attended the University of Nebraska in the United States on scholarships.  They have four children: Max, Buster, Xander and Knox.

After retirement from competition, Adam became General Manager of Community Sports at Swimming Australia. Following that position, Pine became the administrative head of the Paralympic Swimming Program for Swimming Australia he has held this position since 2013. He was appointed Team Leader for the Australian Swim Team at the 2016 Rio Paralympics.

See also
 List of Commonwealth Games medallists in swimming (men)
 List of Olympic medalists in swimming (men)

References

External links
 
 
 
 

1976 births
Living people
Australian male butterfly swimmers
People from Lismore, New South Wales
Sportsmen from New South Wales
Olympic swimmers of Australia
Swimmers at the 2008 Summer Olympics
Swimmers at the 2000 Summer Olympics
Swimmers at the 2004 Summer Olympics
Olympic gold medalists for Australia
Olympic silver medalists for Australia
Commonwealth Games silver medallists for Australia
Australian male freestyle swimmers
World Aquatics Championships medalists in swimming
Australian Institute of Sport swimmers
Medalists at the FINA World Swimming Championships (25 m)
Medalists at the 2008 Summer Olympics
Nebraska Cornhuskers men's swimmers
Medalists at the 2000 Summer Olympics
Commonwealth Games gold medallists for Australia
Commonwealth Games bronze medallists for Australia
Olympic silver medalists in swimming
Olympic gold medalists in swimming
Commonwealth Games medallists in swimming
Universiade medalists in swimming
Goodwill Games medalists in swimming
Swimmers at the 1994 Commonwealth Games
Swimmers at the 1998 Commonwealth Games
Swimmers at the 2002 Commonwealth Games
Universiade gold medalists for Australia
Recipients of the Medal of the Order of Australia
Medalists at the 1999 Summer Universiade
Competitors at the 2001 Goodwill Games
Medallists at the 1994 Commonwealth Games
Medallists at the 1998 Commonwealth Games
Medallists at the 2002 Commonwealth Games